Stanley H. Ford (1877–1961) was a Lieutenant General in the United States Army. General Ford may also refer to:

Elbert L. Ford (1892–1990), U.S. Army major general
James Hobart Ford (1829–1867), Union Army brevet brigadier general
John Salmon Ford (1815–1897),  Confederate States Army brigadier general
Richard Ford (Royal Marines officer) (1878–1949), Royal Marines general
Robert Ford (British Army officer) (1923–2015), British Army general who was Adjutant-General to the Forces

See also
Edward Foord (1825–1899), British Army lieutenant general
Attorney General Ford (disambiguation)